This is a list of dragons in film and television. The dragons are organized by either film or television and further by whether the media is animation or live-action. They are sorted alphabetically by name or if there is none, by the name of the media. Further information is the title of the media, the type of dragon, whether it transforms to/from something else, the voice actor if it has one and additional notes.

Dragon Types:
European: 4 legged and winged. Common in films involving dragons being slain or ridden.
Drake: 4 legged, not winged, and commonly possessing a short body. Frequent in 20th century animation when wing animation was difficult for the artists.
Asian: 4 legged, not winged, and possessing a long body. Often found in anime, western animation and films with East Asian themes.
Wyvern: 2 legged, winged. Common in films involving dragons being slain. Their popularity increased in the 21st century with the rise of live action CGI but the difficulty in animating classical 6 limbed European dragons remained
Serpentine: has no legs or wings and frequently appearing in animation as a lake monster
Amphithere: has no legs but possesses wings. These are uncommon
Alien: Dragons with unusual alien physical appearance. These appear in Sci-Fi films
Other: The Dragon has a shape not conforming to any of the above categorizations

In the type of dragon there may be an indicator with a number followed by "H" this means the dragon has multiple heads, if it is wingless it is typically a Hydra.

Dragons in film

Live-action film

Animated film

Dragons in television 
Appearance lists when the dragon appears

Live-action television

Animated television

Western animated television

Anime television

See also
 List of dragons in games
 List of dragons in literature
 List of dragons in popular culture
 List of dragons in mythology and folklore

Notes

References

Dragons in popular culture
film and television
Dragons
Lists of films and television series